The Coupe de la Ligue Final 2002 was a football match held at Stade de France, Saint-Denis on 20 April 2002, that saw FC Girondins de Bordeaux defeat FC Lorient 3–0 thanks to goals by Pauleta (2) and Camel Meriem.

Match details

See also
2001–02 Coupe de la Ligue

External links
Report on LFP official site

2002
FC Girondins de Bordeaux matches
FC Lorient matches
2001–02 in French football
April 2002 sports events in France
Sport in Saint-Denis, Seine-Saint-Denis
Football competitions in Paris
2002 in Paris